George Leroy Blair (born May 10, 1938) is a former halfback for the University of Mississippi football Rebels (Ole Miss), playing in the 1958 Gator Bowl (Florida), and the 1959 Sugar Bowl (LSU), and the 1960 Sugar Bowl (Rice). He also played in the 1961 Senior Bowl at Mobile and the College All-Star Game in Chicago against the Philadelphia Eagles after his senior year at Ole Miss.  Drafted by the American Football League's San Diego Chargers, as a placekicker, played for the four seasons (1961 - 1964) and won an AFL championship with them in 1963.

See also
List of American Football League players

References 

1938 births
Living people
People from Pascagoula, Mississippi
Players of American football from Mississippi
American football placekickers
American football defensive backs
Ole Miss Rebels football players
San Diego Chargers players
American Football League All-Star players
American Football League players